Bearii is a town in Victoria, Australia. The town is in the Shire of Moira local government area.

History
Bearii was surveyed for a township about 1875 and named by Mr Stein, an early settler after a place bearing that name in Germany.

The streets are named after some of the early settlers, amongst these are Myers, Tallon, Coghill, Williams and Stein
streets.

Bearii Post Office opened on 10 November 1913 and closed in 1956.

References

Towns in Victoria (Australia)
Shire of Moira